Lycée Blaise Pascal de Libreville is a French international school in Libreville, Gabon. It includes collège (junior high school) and lycée (senior high school) levels.

The school is named after the 17th-century French scholar Blaise Pascal. It was established in 1992.

See also

 Education in Gabon
 List of international schools

References

External links
  , the school's official website

Educational institutions with year of establishment missing
Educational institutions established in 1992
Buildings and structures in Libreville
French international schools in Gabon
International high schools
High schools and secondary schools in Gabon